"Shut Down Turn Off" is a song by Australian band Little River Band, released in March 1978 as the lead single from the group's fourth studio album, Sleeper Catcher. The song peaked at number 16 on the Australian charts.

Track listing
Australian 7" (EMI 11691)
Side A. "Shut Down Turn Off" - 3:54
Side B. "Days On the Road" (Live from Rainbow Theatre, London.) - 5:17

Charts

References 

1978 songs
1978 singles
Little River Band songs
Songs written by Glenn Shorrock
Song recordings produced by John Boylan (record producer)
EMI Records singles